Phillip Hodson (born April 1946 in Bedfordshire) is a British psychotherapist, broadcaster and author who popularised ‘phone-in’ therapy in his role as Britain's first 'agony uncle'. His afternoon and evening counselling programmes ran on LBC Radio in London for nearly 20 years. Thereafter he worked on Talk Radio and with Jimmy Young on BBC Radio 2.

Television 
He was a regular children's counsellor on BBC1 for six years with Saturday Superstore and Going Live! presented by Sarah Greene and Phillip Schofield, where he was noted for addressing serious juvenile concerns not normally treated on children's television. Hodson also worked on BBC1 Daytime with Dr Miriam Stoppard for three years dealing with problem phone calls besides psycho-analysing celebrities. He also filled the agony slots in the first years of both TV-am and GMTV.

Hodson co-presented TV South's afternoon Problem Page for five years and was subsequently given his own interview chat show Hodson Confidential. This ran for three series, and was networked several times. He has also made several documentaries including films for Newsnight on subjects such as scandal-prone politicians.

Journalism 
Hodson has been a contributor to The Times and has also written extensively for the popular press including agony pages for Reveille, The Daily Star, Today and the News of the World. His column also appeared in publictioms such as Woman's World, Cosmopolitan, Family Circle, Fast Forward, TV Quick, Woman and Home and Woman's Journal. Hodson won a 'columnist of the year' in 1984. He has been an outspoken critic of the 'stiff upper lip' attitude of male conservatism – clashing, amongst others, with the sociologist Frank Furedi.

Books, academic and psychotherapy work 
Hodson has written 13 books mainly on sex and relationships but also covering the operas of Wagner.  His most important is probably Men: An Investigation into the Emotional Male, which accompanied a BBC TV series in one of the first male engagements with the challenges of feminism.  He has also taught psychology at graduate level and made training films for Video Arts Ltd about using counselling techniques in the workplace, also winning several industry awards.  In addition to his psychotherapy practice, Hodson has been chief spokesperson for the British Association for Counselling and Psychotherapy since 2000.

Phillip Hodson has been ‘happily unmarried’ to author and psychotherapist Anne Hooper for over 30 years with whom he has a son Alex Hooper-Hodson and two stepsons, Barnaby and Joel Levy. All three work in the media, Alex being author of teen guide to life 'The Boy Files' published by Wayland Books as well as the weekly columnist for the Daily Record'''s 'Teen Talk'.

Alex was also the agony uncle of Sugar magazine for six years until the magazine's cancellation in 2010, as well as writing Sex Talk With Alex – also for the Daily Record''.

Notes

External links
Debrett's People of Today

1946 births
Living people
People from Bedfordshire
British columnists
British psychotherapists